The office of the District Attorney of Philadelphia is the largest prosecutor's office in the state of Pennsylvania and oversees a jurisdiction that includes more than 1.5 million citizens of both the city and county of Philadelphia.  The current District Attorney of Philadelphia is Larry Krasner. The district attorney represents the Commonwealth of Pennsylvania and the City & County of Philadelphia in all criminal and other prosecutions.

The district attorney is an elected office, and terms begin on the first Monday in January following the election.  Prior to 1850, the functions of this office were performed by a deputy state attorney-general. An Act of 3 May 1850 P.L. 654 authorized the voters of each of Pennsylvania's counties to elect one person, of requisite legal background to serve as district attorney for a term of three years. The term was extended to four years under the State Constitution of 1874, Article 14.

List of District Attorneys of Philadelphia

References

External links
Phila.Gov | Office of the District Attorney : R. Seth Williams:

District

District